The AFL Rising Star is an Australian rules football award presented annually to the player adjudged the best young player in the Australian Football League (AFL) for the year. It was first presented in the 1993 season, and was won by Nathan Buckley, playing for the Brisbane Bears. The recipient of the AFL Rising Star has been awarded the Ron Evans Medal since 2007, named in honour of the former AFL Commission chairman following his death that year.

The award was sponsored by Norwich Union Australia from its inception in 1993 until 2000. The AFL then secured a six-year sponsorship deal with Ansett Australia in 2001, that included the Rising Star award; however, this agreement only lasted the one season following the collapse of Ansett in September 2001. National Australia Bank (NAB) has sponsored the award since 2002. An equivalent award has existed in the AFL Women's league since its inception in 2017.

's eight nominations in the 2012 season is the most any club has achieved in a season. The most recent recipient of the award is 's Nick Daicos, winning in 2022.

Eligibility and nominations 
A player is nominated for the award each round during the AFL season by a panel of experts. The nominee is usually chosen based on their performance in that particular round; however, for nominations closer to the end of the year, the player's performance over the whole season is taken into consideration. To be eligible for nomination, the player must be under the age of 21 at 1 January that year, and have played ten or fewer AFL games as of the start of the season. A player can only be nominated once per season; if a player is suspended during the season, he may be nominated, but will not be eligible to win the award. At the completion of the regular season, each member of the voting panel independently awards five votes, four votes, three votes, two votes and one vote to the nominated players they regard as the best to fifth-best during the season; the player with the highest total of votes wins the medal.

As the number of voting members varies between seasons, the maximum number of votes a player can poll is not consistent. There have been only four winners who have accumulated the maximum votes in their season: Jared Rivers (2004), Daniel Rich (2009), Dan Hannebery (2010) and Nick Daicos (2022).

It is possible for a player to be nominated in multiple seasons, as long as he still satisfies the age and experience criteria in each year. Sixteen players have been nominated twice for a Rising Star award:

 Duncan Kellaway (1993 and 1994)
 Craig Callaghan (1995 and 1996)
 Michael Braun (1997 and 1998)
 Luke Power (1998 and 1999)
 Nathan Jones (2006 and 2007)

 Mark LeCras (2006 and 2007)
 Michael Hurley (2009 and 2010)
 Jordan Gysberts (2010 and 2011)
 Sam Blease (2011 and 2012)
 Orazio Fantasia (2015 and 2016)

 Alex Witherden (2017 and 2018)
 Lachlan Sholl (2020 and 2021)
 Mitch Georgiades (2020 and 2021)
 Luke Jackson (2020 and 2021)
 Tom Green (2020 and 2021)

 Justin McInerney (2020 and 2021)
 Jake Bowey (2021 and 2022)

Recipients

Club totals

See also 
AFL Women's Rising Star

Notes

References 

Australian Football League awards
Australian rules football awards
Awards established in 1993
1993 establishments in Australia
Rookie player awards